Xanthippe is a genus of mites in the family Ascidae.

Species
 Xanthippe clavisetosa Naskrecki & Colwell, 1995      
 Xanthippe hendersoni Naskrecki & Colwell, 1995

References

Ascidae